In logic and mathematics, relation construction and relational constructibility have to do with the ways that one relation is determined by an indexed family or a sequence of other relations, called the relation dataset.  The relation in the focus of consideration is called the faciendum.  The relation dataset typically consists of a specified relation over sets of relations, called the constructor, the factor, or the method of construction, plus a specified set of other relations, called the faciens, the ingredients, or the makings.

Relation composition and relation reduction are special cases of relation constructions.

See also
 Projection
 Relation
 Relation composition

Mathematical relations